Zachary Bostrom also credited as "Zach", (born January 15, 1981) is an American actor. As a child actor, he was best known for his role as Ernie Henderson in the sitcom Harry and the Hendersons and Kevin Brady in the 1988 TV Movie A Very Brady Christmas. In 1999, he portrayed Brett, the title character's nemesis, in the popular made-for-TV Disney movie Johnny Tsunami. In 2014, he appeared in two episodes of the sci-fi TV mini-series, Necrolectric.

Filmography

Film

Television

References

External links

Nytimes.com

1981 births
Living people
American male television actors
American male film actors
Male actors from Los Angeles
American male child actors